Falls of Moness is a waterfall of Scotland. The Falls of Moness located in Aberfeldy, Perthshire, Scotland is a 150m high waterfall tucked away in the Birks of Aberfeldy.

See also

Waterfalls of Scotland

References

External links
The Birks of Aberfeldy - Perth and Kinross Countryside Trust

Waterfalls of Scotland